The following is a timeline of the history of the city of Parma in the Emilia-Romagna region of Italy.

Prior to 18th century

 187 BCE – Via Aemilia (road) built through Parma.
 183 BCE – Parma becomes a Roman colony.
 4th century CE – Roman Catholic Diocese of Parma established (approximate date).
 452 CE – Parma burned by forces of Attila.
 569 CE – Alboin in power.
 1046 – Cadalus becomes bishop.
 1106 – Parma Cathedral consecrated.
 1117 – Earthquake.
 1248 – Battle of Parma.
 1281 – Parma Baptistery built.
 1307 –  in power.
 1346 – Visconti in power.
 1356 – La Rocchetta citadel built.
 1472 – Printing press in operation.
 1488 – Banca Monte Parma (bank) established.
 1510 – San Giovanni Evangelista church built (approximate date).
 1512 – Parma becomes a papal possession.
 1521 –  by French forces.
 1539 – Sanctuary of Santa Maria della Steccata built.
 1545 – Duchy of Parma established.
 1574 – Accademia degli Innominati founded.
 1580 – Palazzo della Pilotta construction begins.
 1591 –  built.
 1627 –  and  rebuilt (approximate date).
 1628 – Teatro Farnese (theatre) opens.

18th–19th centuries
 1734 – Austrians in power.
 1735 – Gazzetta di Parma newspaper begins publication.
 1757 – Academy of Fine Arts of Parma founded.
 1769 – Royal Library of Parma inaugurated.
 1808 – Parma becomes part of the French Taro (department).
 1817 –  (cemetery) established.
 1829 – Nuovo Teatro Ducale (theatre) built.
 1833 – Population: 48,523.
 1849 - Baron d'Aspre with 15,000 Austrians took possession of Parma.
 1855 – 26 December: Premiere of Verdi's opera I vespri siciliani.
 1859
 June: Political unrest.
 Parma railway station opens.
 1860 –  (history society) founded.
 1861
 Parma becomes part of the Kingdom of Italy.
  (concert band) active.
 1865 – Biblioteca Popolare Circolante (library) organized.
 1866 –  built.
 1867 – Future orchestra conductor Arturo Toscanini born in Parma.
 1884 – Parma-Colorno railway begins operating.
 1885 – Brescia–Parma railway begins operating.
 1888 –  active.
 1893 – National Camera del Lavoro congress held in Parma.
 1899 –  begins operating.

20th century

 1906 - Population: 48,523.
 1908 – Labor strike.
 1910 –  and  begin operating.
 1911 – Population: 51,910.
 1913 – Parma Foot Ball Club formed.
 1920 –  erected.
 1922 – August:  (political unrest).
 1923
 Parma Airport built.
 Stadio Ennio Tardini (stadium) opens.
 1925 –  constructed.
 1930 –  (library) established.
 1931 – Population: 71,282.
 1943 – Parma occupied by German forces.
 1944 – Bombing of Parma in World War II.
 1945 – German forces ousted.
 1951 – Population: 122,978.
 1953 – Trolleybus system begins operating.
 1961 – Population: 147,368.
 1971 – Population: 175,228.
 1978 –  begins broadcasting.

21st century

 2001 –  built.
 2002 –  established.
 2012 – May:  held; Federico Pizzarotti becomes mayor.
 2013 – Population: 177,714.

See also
 Parma history
 
 
 List of mayors of Parma
 List of bishops of Parma
 List of dukes of Parma, 1545–1859
  (state archives)
 

Timelines of other cities in the macroregion of Northeast Italy:(it)
 Emilia-Romagna region: Timeline of Bologna; Ferrara; Forlì; Modena;  Piacenza; Ravenna; Reggio Emilia; Rimini
 Friuli-Venezia Giulia region: Timeline of Trieste
 Trentino-South Tyrol region: Timeline of Trento
 Veneto region: Timeline of Padua; Treviso; Venice; Verona; Vicenza

References

This article incorporates information from the Italian Wikipedia.

Bibliography

in English
 
 
 
 
 
 
  + (1870 ed.)

in Italian

  (List of libraries)
 
  (List of libraries)

External links

 Items related to Parma, various dates (via Europeana)
 Items related to Parma, various dates (via Digital Public Library of America)

Parma
Parma
History of Parma